is a Japanese manga series written and illustrated by Rei Toma. Set in the same world as Toma's previous work Dawn of the Arcana, the series began serialization in Shogakukan's Cheese! magazine in January 2019, with the series' individual chapters collected into eleven volumes as of October 2022.

Publication
Written and illustrated by Rei Toma, the series began serialization in Shogakukan's Cheese! magazine on January 24, 2019. As of October 2022, the series' individual chapters have been collected into eleven tankōbon volumes.

In July 2020, Viz Media announced that they licensed the series for English publication. The series is also licensed in Indonesia by Elex Media Komputindo.

Volume list

Reception
Rebecca Silverman from Anime News Network praised the story and use of silent panels, though she felt that some of the characters were too similar. Danica Davidson from Otaku USA praised the story and artwork. John C. Smith from Comic Book Resources praised the artwork and characters, though he felt the story shared many similarities to other shōjo manga. Gina DiGiovancarlo, also from Comic Book Resources, likened the series' storytelling to that of the Chinese folk tale Mulan.

In 2022, the series was nominated for the 68th Shogakukan Manga Award in the shōjo manga category.

See also
The Water Dragon's Bride, another manga series by the same creator

References

External links
 

Adventure anime and manga
Fantasy anime and manga
Romance anime and manga
Shogakukan manga
Shōjo manga
Viz Media manga